Adam Robert Christodoulou (born 11 June 1989, in Lichfield) is a Greek-British racing driver, who won the 2008 British Formula Renault Championship, also won the 2009 Star Mazda Championship in the United States. His less successful cousin Riki Christodoulou is also a racing driver, having competed in British Formula 3 Championship.

Career

Karting
Christodoulou began his racing career in karting in Britain. His first competitive success came in the 2001 Kartmasters British Grand Prix - comer cadet where he came 1st in class, the first of many accolades in his burgeoning career.

However in 2006 an MSA court found that Christodoulou had competed in a meeting at Rowrah on 5 June 2005 using illegally-modified engines. These had been modified by Peter Christodoulou whose actions resulted in a fine of £30,000.

In 2017, Christodoulou admitted to still suffering night terrors and regular involuntary bowel movements due to the events which he claimed to know ‘nothing about’.

Formula Renault
Christodoulou began his career in single seater racing in the 2006 Formula Renault UK Winter Series and gained 4th place at Croft round 2, race 1 and managed a fastest lap at Croft round 2, race 2.

In the 2007 British Formula Renault Championship, Adam had the most podium finishes in Europe and the UK out of any rookie driver, he came fourth overall and won the coveted graduate cup with a prize of £15,000. (He came behind Duncan Tappy, Dean Smith and Will Bratt). During this year he was invited to become a BRDC young driver.

During the Formula Renault 2.0 UK Winter Series 2007 he finished 3rd.

In 2007 Christodoulou also competed in the Formula Renault 2.0 Northern European Cup, and although he only took part in 4 rounds he still gained podium finishes and came 8th out of 44.

Back in the British Formula Renault Championship for 2008, Adam finished the season with 7 wins, 4 new lap records and 11 podium finishes. On 21 September he secured the UK Formula Renault 2.0 Championship title with 472 points.

During this year Adam's team, CR Scuderia, was managed by Andrew Kirkaldy who races the FIA GT and the team principal, Chris Niarchos, of the Cobra Group also races in the FIA GT series alongside Tim Mullen and Rob Bell of the CR Scuderia team.

In December 2008 he was one of six finalists for the prestigious McLaren Autosport BRDC Award, and won the Autosport Awards British Club Driver 2008.

Star Mazda
In 2009, Christodoulou competed in the Star Mazda series, a single seater class in the US, and won the championship, with 3 wins and 9 podium finishes. He has again been nominated for the McLaren Autosport BRDC Award. He will test an Indy Lights car for Sam Schmidt Motorsports in October 2009 after having previously tested for Bryan Herta Autosport in the same series.

Sports cars
For 2010, he ran in the Rolex Sports Car Series GT class for Newman Wachs Racing with co-driver John Edwards.

Other information
Adam competed in the "race4charity" celebrity kart race organised by BP Ultimate at the Autosport International show in 2008. Adam broke the lap record and his team won the charity event where they raced against such drivers as Allan McNish, Paul di Resta, Sam Bird and Nathan Caratti amongst others.

Racing record

Career summary

Star Mazda Championship results
(key)

See also
List of sportspeople with dual nationality

References

External links

Report on Christodoulou's ban from Karting

Living people
1989 births
Sportspeople from Lichfield
English racing drivers
24 Hours of Daytona drivers
European Le Mans Series drivers
Rolex Sports Car Series drivers
Formula Renault 2.0 NEC drivers
British Formula Renault 2.0 drivers
Formula Renault Eurocup drivers
Indy Pro 2000 Championship drivers
British people of Greek descent
Blancpain Endurance Series drivers
International GT Open drivers
24 Hours of Spa drivers
British GT Championship drivers
24H Series drivers
MP Motorsport drivers
Mercedes-AMG Motorsport drivers
JDC Motorsports drivers
Newman Wachs Racing drivers
CRS Racing drivers
Strakka Racing drivers
Nürburgring 24 Hours drivers
GT4 European Series drivers